Le Tallec is a French surname. Notable people with the surname include:

Tallec derives from talek which means someone with a large forehead in Breton. (cf. tal)

Camille Le Tallec (1906-1991), French ceramist and artist
Anthony Le Tallec (born 1984), French football player
Damien Le Tallec (born 1990), French football player

See also
Le Tallec's marks
Le Tallec's patterns

References

External links
Distribution of the surname Tallec in France

Breton-language surnames